Joaquín Martínez Pastor (born 26 October 1987, in Alcantarilla, Region of Murcia) is a Spanish footballer who plays for CA Pulpileño as a right back.

External links

Stats at HLSZ 

1987 births
Living people
People from Alcantarilla
Spanish footballers
Footballers from the Region of Murcia
Association football defenders
Segunda División B players
Tercera División players
Real Murcia Imperial players
Pontevedra CF footballers
Lorca Atlético CF players
UCAM Murcia CF players
Orihuela CF players
CD Torrevieja players
Nemzeti Bajnokság I players
Ferencvárosi TC footballers
Spanish expatriate footballers
Expatriate footballers in Hungary
Spanish expatriate sportspeople in Hungary